Lloyd Bowen Koch (17 June 1931 – 16 April 2013) was a South African cricketer. He played first-class cricket for Rhodesia, Natal and Orange Free State between 1948 and 1961.

As well as cricket, he played field hockey and represented Rhodesia at the 1964 Summer Olympics. He was also the flag bearer for his nation at the games.

See also
 List of Rhodesian representative cricketers

References

External links
 

1931 births
2013 deaths
South African cricketers
Rhodesia cricketers
KwaZulu-Natal cricketers
Free State cricketers
Cricketers from Pietermaritzburg
South African emigrants to Rhodesia
Rhodesian male field hockey players
Olympic field hockey players of Rhodesia
Field hockey players at the 1964 Summer Olympics
White Rhodesian people